Bellegarde-en-Diois (Vivaro-Alpine: Bèlagarda de Diés) is a commune in the Drôme department in southeastern France.

Population

See also
Communes of the Drôme department

References

Communes of Drôme